The following is a timeline of the history of the city of Coimbra, Portugal.

Prior to 20th century

 ca.563 CE – Roman Catholic Diocese of Coimbra established.
 714 CE – Muslims in power.
 1064 – Coimbra taken by Christian forces of Ferdinand I.
 1139 – Coimbra becomes seat of Kingdom of Portugal (until 1385).
 1169 – San Salvador church established.
 1211 –  (assembly) held in Coimbra.
 1286 – Monastery of Santa Clara-a-Velha founded.
 1308 – University moves to Coimbra from Lisbon.
 1316 – Monastery of Santa Clara-a-Velha construction begins.
 1338 – University moves away from Coimbra back to Lisbon.
 1354 – University again moves to Coimbra from Lisbon.
 1355 – Queen consort Inês de Castro murdered at Quinta das Lágrimas.
 1377 – University again moves away from Coimbra back to Lisbon.
 1385 –  held in Coimbra.
 1398 –  held in Coimbra.
 1472 –  held in Coimbra.
 1481 – Poet Francisco de Sá de Miranda born in Coimbra.
 1536 – Printing press in operation.
 1537 – University once again moves to Coimbra from Lisbon.
 1580/98 – New Cathedral of Coimbra construction begins.
 1728 – Casa da Livraria (library) built.
 1733 – University clocktower built.
 1755 – 1 November: Earthquake.
 1810 – Coimbra "sacked by the French under Marshal Massena."
 1812 –  (newspaper) begins publication.
 1834 – Miguel I of Portugal, makes the city his headquarters.
 1835 – Town becomes part of newly created administrative Coimbra district.
 1846 – "Miguelist insurrection" occurs.
 1852 –  founded.
 1874 – Horsecar tram begins operating.
 1885 –  opens; Ramal da Coimbra (railway) begins operating.
 1887 – Coimbra Academic Association student union formed.
 1900 – Population: 18,144.

20th century

 1910 – Ancient Roman Conímbriga ruins near Coimbra designated a national monument.
 1911
 Electric trams begins operating.
 Population: 20,581.
 1930
 Diário de Coimbra newspaper begins publication.
 City coat of arms redesign adopted.
 1947 – Trolleybus begins operating.
 1954 – Ponte de Santa Clara (bridge) opens.
 1958 – University-related  active.
 1962 – University of Coimbra General Library rebuilt.
 1963 – Coimbra University Stadium opens.
 1970 – May: Student unrest.
 1981 –  (bridge) opens.
 1982 – City joins the regional Associação Informática da Região Centro.
 1986 – Coimbra University Radio begins broadcasting.
 1996 – Metro Mondego transit entity formed to plan regional light rail system (as of 2017 unrealized).
 1998 – Cm-coimbra.pt website online (approximate date).

21st century
 2001
  becomes mayor.(pt)
 Population: 104,489.
 2002 - Estádio Municipal Sérgio Conceição (stadium) built.
 2003 - Estádio Cidade de Coimbra (stadium) opens.
 2004
 Ponte Rainha Santa Isabel (bridge) opens.
 Part of UEFA Euro 2004 football contest played in Coimbra.
 2005 – August: Wildfire burns in area around city.
 2007 – Pedro e Inês footbridge opens.
 2010
 João Paulo Barbosa de Melo becomes mayor.(pt)
 2011 – July:  meets in Coimbra.
 2013 – Manuel Machado becomes mayor.(pt)
 2017
 June: June 2017 Portugal wildfires burn in region near city.
 October:  held.

See also
 
 Aeminium, Roman city 
 List of mayors of Coimbra
  (municipal magistrates)
 List of bishops of Coimbra
 
 Timelines of other cities/municipalities in Portugal: Braga, Funchal (Madeira), Lisbon, Porto, Setúbal

References

This article incorporates information from the Portuguese Wikipedia.

Bibliography

in English
 
 
 
   (Bibliography)
 
in Portuguese
 
 no.1, ca. 1491; no.3, ca. 1518; etc.
 
  ca. 1840–
 
 
 
 
 
 
 
  circa 1900

External links

  (city archives)
 
 

 
Coimbra
Coimbra
Years in Portugal